Canada competed at the 2016 Winter Youth Olympics in Lillehammer, Norway from 12 to 21 February 2016. Isabelle Charest was named as the chef de mission.

Medalists

Medalists in mixed NOCs events

Alpine skiing

Canada qualified a full team of two boys and two girls. The team is listed below.

Boys

Girls

Parallel mixed team

Biathlon

Canada qualified a full team of four athletes (two boys and two girls). The team was officially named on December 23, 2015.

Boys

Girls

Mixed

Bobsleigh

Cross country skiing

Canada qualified a full team of one boy and one girl. The team was officially named on December 17, 2015.

Boys

Girls

Curling

Canada qualified a mixed team of four athletes. The team was officially named on April 14, 2015.

Mixed team

Team: Mary Fay (skip), Tyler Tardi, Karlee Burgess, Sterling Middleton

Round Robin

Draw 1

Draw 2

Draw 3

Draw 4

Draw 5

Draw 6

Draw 7

Quarterfinals

Semifinals

Gold Medal Final

Final rank:

Mixed doubles

Figure skating

Singles

Couples

Mixed NOC team trophy

Freestyle skiing

Halfpipe

Ski cross

Hockey

Canada qualified a boys' team of 17 athletes. The team was named on January 14, 2016. Forward Carson Focht will also represent the country in the boys' skill challenge tournament as well.

Boys' tournament
Roster

 Alexis Gravel (G)
 Olivier Rodrigue (G)
 Jett Woo (D)
 Jared McIsaac (D)
 Ty Smith (D)
 Ryan Merkley (D)
 Dennis Busby (D)
 Declan Chisholm (D)
 Benoît-Olivier Groulx (FW)
 Aidan Dudas (FW)
 Gabriel Fortier (FW)
 Luka Burzan (FW)
 Tristen Nielsen (FW)
 Anderson MacDonald (FW)
 Allan McShane (FW)
 Carson Focht (FW)
 Connor Roberts (FW)

Group Stage

Semifinals

Gold medal game

Final rank: 

Skills challenge

Luge

Individual sleds

Mixed team relay

Skeleton

Snowboarding

Canada qualified a team of one boy and three girls.

Halfpipe

Snowboard cross

Slopestyle

Snowboard and ski cross relay

Qualification legend: FA – Qualify to medal round; FB – Qualify to consolation round

See also
Canada at the 2016 Summer Olympics

References

Nations at the 2016 Winter Youth Olympics
Canada at the Youth Olympics
2016 in Canadian sports